Joaquín Noy González (born December 3, 1992) is a Uruguayan footballer who plays for Villa Teresa.

Career
Noy began his career in 2013 with Deportivo Maldonado

References

External links
Joaquín Noy at Footballdatabase

1992 births
People from Colonia del Sacramento
Uruguayan footballers
Uruguayan expatriate footballers
Montevideo Wanderers F.C. players
Plaza Colonia players
Rampla Juniors players
Deportivo Maldonado players
Deportivo Azogues footballers
Miramar Misiones players
Once Caldas footballers
Club Atlético River Plate (Montevideo) players
FC Juárez footballers
Villa Española players
Villa Teresa players
Liga MX players
Uruguayan Primera División players
Uruguayan Segunda División players
Categoría Primera A players
Footballers from Montevideo
Living people
Association football midfielders
Uruguayan expatriate sportspeople in Colombia
Uruguayan expatriate sportspeople in Mexico
Expatriate footballers in Colombia
Expatriate footballers in Mexico